Rick Kowalsky (born March 20, 1972) is a Canadian former professional ice hockey player. He was selected by the Buffalo Sabres in the 10th round (227th overall) of the 1992 NHL Entry Draft.

Kowalsky played four seasons (1989 – 1993) of major junior hockey with the Sault Ste. Marie Greyhounds of the Ontario Hockey League, scoring 54 goals and 100 assists for 144 points, while earning 259 penalty minutes, in 209 games played. He went on to play 12 seasons of professional hockey, including 183 games played in the American Hockey League and 516 games in the ECHL. Kowalsky retired as a player following the 2004–05 season during which he helped the Trenton Titans capture the Kelly Cup as the 2005 ECHL Champions. In 2017, he was elected into the ECHL Hall of Fame. 

Kowalsky spent 15 seasons as a coach in the New Jersey Devils organization of the National Hockey League (NHL), including spent eight seasons as the head coach of their American Hockey League (AHL) affiliate, the Albany Devils and the Binghamton Devils. As the head coach for Albany in 2015–16, Kowalsky was named AHL Coach of the Year after leading the Devils to the second round of the playoffs. In 2021, he was hired by the New York Islanders, and his former boss Lou Lamoriello when he was with the Devils, as an assistant coach for their AHL affiliate, the Bridgeport Islanders.

Career statistics

References

External links

Living people
1972 births
Buffalo Sabres draft picks
Canadian ice hockey coaches
Canadian ice hockey right wingers
Cardiff Devils players
Cornwall Aces players
Hampton Roads Admirals players
Norfolk Admirals players
Portland Pirates players
Roanoke Express players
Sault Ste. Marie Greyhounds players
Trenton Titans players
New Jersey Devils coaches
Canadian expatriate ice hockey players in the United States
Canadian expatriate ice hockey players in Wales